Stone Cottage is a heritage-listed homestead complex at Lot 315 Ben Lomond Road, Minto, City of Campbelltown, New South Wales, Australia. It was designed and built in 1830. It is also known as The Jug site or former Vineyards. The property is owned by the New South Wales Department of Planning and Infrastructure. It was added to the New South Wales State Heritage Register on 2 April 1999.

History 
The cottage is believed to have been used for farm hands working at Campbellfield for Dr William Redfern. Dr Redfern lived at Campbellfield from about 1818-1828. During its history, one vendor of the property is recorded as W. L. M. Redfern, Dr Redfern's son.

Prior to that it had not been occupied for about ten years.

The present occupant was told that the building was originally occupied by a convict overseer and a number of convicts, which may explain why one room was not internally connected to the other two rooms.

Description 
It is built of sandstone with two  foot thick cavity walls, painted outside. According to locals, a narrow doorway into the bedroom was associated with an illicit still. The western room is only accessible from outside. There is a verandah to the front of the building and a 1950s timber addition to the rear. The external walls were painted in 1997.

Condition 

As at 26 March 1999, the house has been generally well maintained, however there is a large crack in the sandstone of the eastern wall above the fuse box. There are also several cracks in the western wall and the front facade.

The Stone Cottage appears to be relatively intact, although it has undergone some recent minor alterations.

Modifications and dates 
The owners (Mr & Mrs Briggs) restored the house, keeping all the original door and window openings and the double fireplace(s). Rooms have been added to the rear of the property, and the garden re-done. All the inside walls have been whitewashed, and the external walls were painted by the Department in 1997.

Heritage listing 
As at 1 April 1999, An early stone cottage, of high significance for its association with the use of convict labour in the settlement and the agricultural development of the Macarthur Region. The cottage allows a rare insight into the relationship between convict labourers and overseas and their role in establishing a reliable food source for the colony.

Stone Cottage was listed on the New South Wales State Heritage Register on 2 April 1999 having satisfied the following criteria.

The place is important in demonstrating the course, or pattern, of cultural or natural history in New South Wales.

The Stone Cottage has high historical significance as a possible early convict building associated with the agricultural development of the Macarthur holdings and for its association with Campbellfield. It has further significance for its demonstration of the relationship between convict labourers and overseers and the role they played in establishing a reliable food source for the colony.

The place is important in demonstrating aesthetic characteristics and/or a high degree of creative or technical achievement in New South Wales.

The Stone Cottage has aesthetic significance as an excellent example of a rustic cottage, dating from the colonial period and in the Georgian mode.

The place has a strong or special association with a particular community or cultural group in New South Wales for social, cultural or spiritual reasons.

The Stone Cottage has social significance as an ancillary building associated with the use of convicts as a labout force and for its association with the Redfern family. It has further significance through its demonstration of the relationship between convict labourers and overseers at the time.

The place has potential to yield information that will contribute to an understanding of the cultural or natural history of New South Wales.

The Stone Cottage has technical/research significance for its demonstration of Colonial building techniques and as an ancillary building associated with convict labour and agricultural development.

The place possesses uncommon, rare or endangered aspects of the cultural or natural history of New South Wales.

The Stone Cottage appears to be a relatively rare example of an ancillary building associated with convict labour used on a major landholding. Further assessment and investigation is required to confirm this.

The place is important in demonstrating the principal characteristics of a class of cultural or natural places/environments in New South Wales.

The Stone Cottage is an excellent representative example of an ancillary building associated with the use of convict labour and a major district landholding.

See also 

Australian residential architectural styles

References

Bibliography

Attribution 

New South Wales State Heritage Register
City of Campbelltown (New South Wales)
Homesteads in New South Wales
Articles incorporating text from the New South Wales State Heritage Register